Joseph Milton Grahe (born August 14, 1967) is an American former professional baseball pitcher, who played seven seasons in Major League Baseball (MLB) for the California Angels, Colorado Rockies, and Philadelphia Phillies.

A native of West Palm Beach, Florida, Grahe played college baseball for the University of Miami. In his MLB debut against the Oakland Athletics, he struck out Jose Canseco for his first big league strikeout.

Notes

References

1967 births
Living people
American expatriate baseball players in Canada
Bangor Blue Ox players
Baseball players from Florida
California Angels players
Colorado Rockies players
Colorado Springs Sky Sox players
Columbus Clippers players
Edmonton Trappers players
Florida Complex League Phillies players
Major League Baseball pitchers
Miami Hurricanes baseball players
Midland Angels players
Nashua Pride players
Palm Beach State Panthers baseball players
Philadelphia Phillies players
Reading Phillies players
Scranton/Wilkes-Barre Red Barons players
Sportspeople from West Palm Beach, Florida
Vancouver Canadians players